Sprung may refer to:

Sprung rhythm a poetic rhythm designed to imitate the rhythm of natural speech
Sprung mass (or sprung weight) the portion of the vehicle's total mass that is supported above the suspension
Sprung floor, a floor that absorbs shocks

People with the surname
Adolf Sprung (1848–1909), German meteorologist
Anna Sprung (born 1975), Russian biathlete
Julian Sprung (born 1966), American writer on marine aquarium fishkeeping

Film and TV
Sprung (film), a 1997 hip-hop comedy
Sprung! The Magic Roundabout, a 2005 animation
Sprung, a 2009 comedy short film with Samara Weaving
Sprung (TV series), 2022 series on the streaming service Amazon Freevee.

Games
Sprung (video game), video game by Ubisoft for the Nintendo DS.

Music
Sprung (soundtrack), soundtrack album of the 1997 film
"Sprung", a song by Nu Flavor, 1999
Sprung, a 2011 hip hop festival featuring Lowrider
Sprung Music Festival, Stanford University FloMo Field 
"I'm Sprung", a song by T-Pain

See also

Hohl-Sprung
Spring (disambiguation)